Gabriela Paz Franco (born 30 September 1991 in Valencia) is a retired Venezuelan tennis player.

Her career-high singles world rank was No. 230. On 23 July 2012, she peaked in the doubles world ranking at No. 299. In her career, Paz won eight singles and three doubles titles on the ITF Women's Circuit.

Career
As a junior, she reached a career-high world rank at No. 10. She was the runner-up of the girls' singles tournament at the 2008 US Open, where she lost to wildcard CoCo Vandeweghe.

Paz first played for Venezuela in the 2012 Fed Cup Americas Zone, playing in all five matches, winning four of her five singles, and losing both doubles with partner Adriana Pérez.

Her most recent WTA event was at the 2012 Citi Open in Washington, D.C. where she entered the tournament at world rank No. 280. She played in the qualifying, beating Allie Klick in the first round, and then lost to Michelle Larcher de Brito in the final round of qualifying.

In May 2015, Gabriela Paz confirmed her retirement from professional tennis, saying she wanted to become a coach.

ITF Circuit finals

Singles: 10 (8–2)

Doubles: 6 (3–3)

Junior Grand Slam finals (0–1)

References

External links
 
 
 

Sportspeople from Valencia, Venezuela
Venezuelan female tennis players
1991 births
Living people
20th-century Venezuelan women
21st-century Venezuelan women